United Nations Security Council Resolution 55, adopted on July 29, 1948, having receiving a report from the Committee of Good Offices about a standstill in political and trade negotiations in Indonesia, the Council called upon the governments of the Netherlands and the Republic of Indonesia to maintain strict observance of both the military and economic elements of the Renville Agreement and to implement early and fully its twelve political principles.

The resolution was adopted with nine votes to none; the Ukrainian SSR and Soviet Union abstained.

See also
 List of United Nations Security Council Resolutions 1 to 100 (1946–1953)

References
Text of the Resolution at undocs.org

External links
 

 0055
Indonesian National Revolution
1948 in the Netherlands
 0055
 0055
1948 in Indonesia
July 1948 events